The Tomb of Karl Marx stands in the Eastern cemetery of Highgate Cemetery, North London, England. It commemorates the burial sites of Marx, of his wife, Jenny von Westphalen, and other members of his family. Originally buried in a different part of the Eastern cemetery, the bodies were disinterred and reburied at their present location in 1954. The tomb was designed by Laurence Bradshaw and was unveiled in 1956, in a ceremony led by Harry Pollitt, the General Secretary of the Communist Party of Great Britain, which funded the memorial.

The tomb consists of a large bust of Marx in bronze set on a marble pedestal. The pedestal is inscribed with quotes from Marx's works including, on the front, the final words of The Communist Manifesto, "Workers of all lands unite". Since its construction, the tomb has become a place of pilgrimage for followers of Marxist theory. It has also been a target for Marx's opponents, suffering vandalism, and two bomb attacks in the 1970s. It is a Grade I listed structure, the highest listing reserved for buildings and structures of "exceptional interest".

History 

Marx moved to London as a political exile in June 1849. Living originally in Soho, he moved in 1875 to Maitland Park Road, in the north London area of Belsize Park, and this remained his home until his death in 1883. During this period, Marx wrote some of his most notable works, including The Eighteenth Brumaire of Louis Napoleon and Das Kapital. Throughout his time in London, Marx lived in financially straitened circumstances and was heavily reliant on the support of his friend and collaborator Friedrich Engels. Marx died on the afternoon of 14 March 1883 from a combination of bronchitis and pleurisy, exacerbated by an abscess on his lung. He was buried on the following Saturday, at Highgate Cemetery, in the grave prepared for his wife who had died eighteen months previously. Engels spoke the eulogy at the funeral.

At least thirteen named individuals attended the funeral. They were, apart from Engels, Eleanor Marx, Edward Aveling, Paul Lafargue, Charles Longuet, Helene Demuth, Wilhelm Liebknecht, Gottlieb Lemke, Frederich Lessner, Georg Lochner, Sir Ray Lankester, Carl Schorlemmer and Ernest Radford. A contemporary newspaper account claims that 25 to 30 relatives and friends attended the funeral. A writer in The Graphic noted that, 'By a strange blunder ...his death was not announced for two days, and then as having taken place at Paris. Next day the correction came from Paris; and when his friends and followers hastened to his house in Haverstock Hill, to learn the time and place of burial, they learned that he was already in the cold ground. But for this secresy [sic] and haste, a great popular demonstration would undoubtedly have been held over his grave'.

In 1954, the Marx Memorial Committee, with the agreement of Frederick and Robert-Jean Longuet, Marx's great-grandsons, applied to the Home Office for an exhumation licence allowing the bodies of Marx, his wife, other family members and the Marxs’ housekeeper Helene Demuth to be disinterred and reburied at a new site, some 100 yards from the original graves. The reburials took place during the night of 26/27 November 1954. The reburials were the precursor to the construction of the Karl Marx tomb, designed by Laurence Bradshaw and funded by the Communist Party of Great Britain. The unveiling ceremony on 15 March 1956 was led by the Party's General Secretary, Harry Pollit.

Since its construction, the tomb has become a place of veneration for Marx's followers, including some, such as the anti-apartheid activist Yusuf Dadoo and the founder of the Notting Hill Carnival Claudia Jones, who have been buried nearby.

The tomb is owned by the Marx Grave Trust. The Friends of Highgate Cemetery Trust, which owns the cemetery, charges an entrance fee to the cemetery to cover the costs of upkeep and maintenance; this has generated some controversy. Marx's grave is among the most visited sites at Highgate and has been described as "one of the most recognisable graves in the world".

Vandalism
In 1960, a pair of yellow swastikas were painted on the tomb, as well as slogans in German supporting Nazi SS officer Adolf Eichmann, who was then in custody in Israel. The tomb was the subject of two bombing attempts in the 1970s. The tomb was daubed in blue paint in 2011, but no lasting damage was done. 

In February 2019, it was discovered that the marble plaque from the original grave was damaged in an attack "seemingly with a hammer". A few days later, the monument was vandalised again, the attacker daubing it with the words "doctrine of hate" and "architect of genocide" in red paint. As a result, the Marx Grave Trust decided to install 24-hour video surveillance around the grave to deter further vandalism.

Architecture and description 

The tomb was designed by Laurence Bradshaw, an artist, sculptor and a member of the Communist Party since the 1930s. On obtaining the commission, Bradshaw wrote that the challenge was to create, "not a monument to a man only but to a great mind and a great philosopher". The tomb comprises a large bronze bust of Marx's head and shoulders, set on a marble plinth. 

Bradshaw was responsible for the entire design, including the choice of inscribed texts, and their calligraphy. The texts on the front of the memorial are the closing words of "The Communist Manifesto", "Workers of all lands unite", and those which conclude the Theses on Feuerbach, "The philosophers have only interpreted the world in various ways • the point however is to change it". The sides of the memorial each have three projecting lugs, the top two of which support sculpted wreaths. A central panel records the dates of the births and deaths of Marx, of his wife, of their daughter Eleanor, of their grandson Harry Longuet and of their housekeeper Helene Demuth.

Pevsner, which records the pedestal as being constructed "of granite", describes the head as "colossal". Bradshaw wrote that he wanted the bust to convey the "dynamic force of [Marx's] intellect" and for it to appear at eye-level rather than "towering over the people". The architectural writer Clive Aslet considers the tomb "overwheening" and "the least aesthetically pleasing" monument in Highgate Cemetery. The tomb was listed by Historic England in 1974, and its designation raised to the highest grade, Grade I, in 1999.

Footnotes

References

Sources

External links 
 
 Pathé News footage of the original grave
 Pathé News footage of Nikolai Bulganin and Nikita Khrushchev laying wreaths at the tomb in a ceremony in 1956
 

Karl Marx
1956 sculptures
Bronze sculptures in the United Kingdom
Buildings and structures completed in 1956
Grade I listed monuments and memorials
Monuments and memorials in London
Outdoor sculptures in London
Sculptures of men in the United Kingdom
Grade I listed buildings in the London Borough of Camden
Busts of writers
Communist Party of Great Britain
Vandalized works of art in the United Kingdom
Tombs